Tandav is the second feature film produced by Mohaan Dotel and also the second by director Murray Kerr. The film marks the debut of the rap singer Aashish Rana (Laure) in the Nepali film industry and features Namrata Shrestha, Anup Baral, Alan Gurung, and Beepin Karki. The film was released on August 22, 2014.

Plot
The film starts with a deal of smugglers smuggling guns and ammunition at the border of India and Nepal. Ganesh is the leader of running all these smuggling activities. Amrit (Asish Rana) also works under Ganesh but he tries to help Indian police to catch the Ganesh and stop his on going smuggling activities, finding this Ganesh tries to kill Amrit but Amrit flies away and reach to Paradise guest house where he meets his childhood friend Maya (Namrata Shrestha) and Amir (Alan Gurung). Ganesh also comes with his people to Paradise guest house to kill Amrit. After finding Amir is Police he tries to escape away from guest house but Amir doesn't allow him to go. Few minutes later all the clients along with Amrit, Maya and Amir trapped inside house and surrounded by people of Ganesh. Amrit along with other members of hotel fires to the ganesh and a disastrous war begins. At last, Amrit dies by killing Ganesh with a bomb blast.

Cast
 Aashish Rana as Amrit 
 Namrata Shrestha as Maya
 Anup Baral as Ganesh
 Alan Gurung as Amir
 Bipin Karki as Pratik
Bisharad Basnet as Mote

Soundtrack

See also
List of Nepalese films
Classic (2016 film)

References

Nepalese crime films
2010s Nepali-language films